Nora Chang Wang is the current Chair of New York City's Shuang Wen Academy Network (SWAN), the 501(C)3 organization that started PS184M, America's first Chinese/English dual language public school since 1996  in collaboration with New Visions for Public Schools.

Wang is most recently associated with turmoil at Public School PS184M regarding the unpopular, and possibly illegal, tuition policy of what NY1 News interviewed her as primary advocate. The controversial policy was implemented by Wang in June 2009 when the organization lost funding from the City. It has subsequently led to Department of Education (DOE) investigations into the school where DOE has cited the policy as possibly "illegal". 

Wang was also Commissioner of the Department of Employment (1994–1998) during the New York City mayoral administration of Rudolph Giuliani. Her management of the Department of Employment during those years were assessed by Columbia University professor Ester Fuchs as having "weak leadership, no direction, and no policy vision" in Fuchs' case study "Innovations in City Government: The Case of New York City's Workforce Development System."  

Wang was not appointed a second term and was succeeded in 1998 by Antonio Pagan.

References 

American academic administrators
American academics of Chinese descent
American headmistresses
American women of Asian descent
Living people
Year of birth missing (living people)